Pterolophia cylindricollis is a species of beetle in the family Cerambycidae. It was described by Gressitt in 1942.

References

cylindricollis
Beetles described in 1942